Mudhafar Nouri Fathi (1 July 1948 – 4 July 2007) was an Iraqi football forward who played for Iraq between 1967 and 1971. 

Nouri died on 4 July 2007.

Career statistics

International goals
Scores and results list Iraq's goal tally first.

References

Iraqi footballers
Iraq international footballers
Al-Shorta SC players
Al-Shorta SC managers
1948 births
2007 deaths
Association football forwards
Iraqi football managers